Roman Gibala (born 5 October 1972) is a Czech former professional footballer who played as a midfielder.

Club career
He played mainly for Czech football clubs, as well as for Daegu FC of the South Korean in 2003.

References

Enternal links
 

1972 births
Living people
Czech footballers
FK Drnovice players
FC Hradec Králové players
FK Viktoria Žižkov players
Daegu FC players
K League 1 players
Association football midfielders